Uigorlersuaq Island (old spelling: Uigordlerssuaq) is an uninhabited island in Avannaata municipality in northwestern Greenland.

Geography 
Uigorlersuaq Island is located in the outer belt of islands in Tasiusaq Bay, in the central part of Upernavik Archipelago. In the northwest, it is separated from a smaller Uigorle Island by the inner waterways of the bay. In the southeast, Ikerasak Strait separates it from Tasiusaq Island and Paagussat Island. It is one of the low-lying islands buffering Tasiusaq Island from the west. The highest point on the island is an unnamed  peak in the northern part of the island.

References

Uninhabited islands of Greenland
Tasiusaq Bay
Islands of the Upernavik Archipelago